Michael Arad (Hebrew: מיכאל ארד) is an Israeli-American architect who is best known for being the designer of the National September 11 Memorial & Museum. He won the competition to design the memorial in 2004.

Early life and education
Arad, an Israeli citizen, was born in 1969 in London. London was where his father, Moshe Arad, a former Israeli ambassador to the United States and Mexico, was on a diplomatic mission. Arad lived in Jerusalem for nine years. He did his military service in a Golani Brigade commando unit.

Arad received a bachelor's degree from Dartmouth College, and a master's degree from Georgia Institute of Technology's College of Architecture.

Career
He moved to New York City in 1999 and worked as an architect at Kohn Pedersen Fox for three years. After KPF, Arad briefly worked for Leclere Associate Architects. When he submitted his design to the competition for the World Trade Center memorial, he was working for the New York City Housing Authority, designing police stations for the New York City Police Department. Arad now works for Handel Architects, which has offices in New York and San Francisco.

World Trade Center designer

Ideas for design
Unidentified human remains recovered from the World Trade Center site would be interred at the bottom of the north tower footprint at the site's deepest point, 70 feet underground. At street level, with the help of landscape architect Peter Walker, Arad proposed a cobblestone plaza with moss and grass and planted with eastern white pine trees.

"This design proposes a space that resonates with the feelings of loss and absence that were generated by the death and destruction at the World Trade Center," Arad said in the statement.

Initially criticized for the starkness of the design and failure to differentiate the civilian victims from those who died in the line of duty, Arad presented a revised version in conjunction with Walker. The high cost of the project, originally estimated at $1 billion, also sparked controversy.

Personal life
Arad resides in Douglaston, Queens, New York with his wife, Melanie Arad Fitzpatrick, and his children, Nathaniel, Ariel and Daniella.

See also
 One World Trade Center
 Larry Silverstein
 Maya Lin
 National September 11 Memorial & Museum
 September 11, 2001 attacks
 Christopher O. Ward
Michael Arad 9/11 Memorial Papers at N-YHS

References

Living people
Israeli Jews
Dartmouth College alumni missing graduation year
Israeli architects
21st-century American architects
Georgia Tech alumni
1969 births
People from Douglaston–Little Neck, Queens
Dartmouth College alumni
World Trade Center